Alister McRae (born 20 December 1970) is a British rally driver who competed in the World Rally Championship. He is the son of the five-time British Rally Champion Jimmy McRae and the younger brother of the late 1995 World Rally Champion, Colin McRae, and older brother of property entrepreneur Stuart McRae. His uncle Hugh "Shug" Steele is also a former rally driver.

Career 
Born in Lanark, McRae took his first foray into motorsport at the age of twelve, when he took up motorcycle trials and motorcross. But it was always rallying where he would demonstrate his true colours. Starting out by competing in Scottish Rally Championship events, success wasn't long in coming. In 1992, he won the prestigious Shell Scholarship and the production category of Great Britain's round of the World Rally Championship.

The following years saw further triumphs, culminating with McRae winning the British Rally Championship outright in 1995, at the wheel of a works Nissan Sunny. More manufacturer drives ensued, with a two-year contract being signed to drive the Formula 2 Volkswagen Golf. He famously competed alongside his brother on a one-off basis in the Subaru World Rally Team on the Rally of Great Britain of 1998.

His results and reputation led to his services being secured by the newest manufacturer to join the World Rally Championship, Hyundai. In 1999, he competed in the front wheel drive Coupe while simultaneously developing Hyundai's first world rally car, the Accent WRC, alongside veteran Swede Kenneth Eriksson. Then in 2000, he developed the car further during its first year of actual competition, scoring the manufacturer's first ever WRC points. In 2001, the fruits of two years' hard work began to show, with a series of points-scoring finishes (both drivers particularly impressing in the laborious conditions of that year's wet Rally Portugal) and a narrow miss of the podium on his home event, the Rally of Great Britain (which gave the Accent WRC and Hyundai's best finish in the WRC by that time).

Following his performances with Hyundai, McRae was selected to join Mitsubishi, stalwart of the WRC, in 2002. This transpired to be a difficult year, as the Japanese manufacturer found itself in turmoil, with an uncompetitive new car and a massive management re-structure. Things got even worse for the team when McRae was forced to pull out for the rest of the season due to injuries following a mountain bike crash shortly after that year's Rally San Remo therefore further hindering the team's championship effort. Mitsubishi subsequently pulled out of rallying at the beginning of the 2003 season, to build a new rally car from scratch, leaving McRae to piece together a sporadic privateer campaign at World Championship level, which was rewarded with a points-scoring showing in a Lancer Evolution in New Zealand.

Undaunted by Mitsubishi's subsequent implicit resolve not to recall either himself or 2002 teammate François Delecour as the source of one of the few remaining factory opportunities sought to regroup for the 2004 season, McRae entered the 2004 Production World Rally Championship instead. He was on course to take the title on the last event before a mechanical failure struck, handing the title to Niall McShea.

In 2006, McRae successfully competed in the Chinese Rally Championship with the Wanyu Rally Team in a Mitsubishi Evo 9, along with a number of other selected international events. McRae also added to his tally of World championship appearances in the new Toyota Corolla S2000 at the 2006 Wales Rally GB, racking up four Group N stage wins.

McRae filled in for his brother Colin alongside F1 driver David Coulthard at the 2007 Race of Champions held at Wembley following Colin's death just two months earlier.

He participated in 2009 Dakar Rally.

He drove a Proton Satria Neo Super 2000 at the Indonesian leg of the APRC 2009.

He made his FIA World Rallycross Championship debut in the 9th round of the 2017 season in France.

Personal life
McRae is the father of Max McRae who is also a motorsport racer.

Racing record

Complete WRC results

PWRC results

SWRC results

APRC results

Complete FIA World Rallycross Championship results
(key)

Supercar

References

External links 

 Alister McRae.com Official Website
 Rallybase stats page
 WRC Archive stats page

1970 births
Living people
Scottish Rally Championship
Scottish rally drivers
World Rally Championship drivers
Intercontinental Rally Challenge drivers
Sportspeople from Lanark
Hyundai Motorsport drivers